Olesya Kim (born 6 September 2002) is an Uzbekistani tennis player. Kim made her WTA debut at the 2017 Tashkent Open as a wildcard entry.

ITF Junior Finals

Singles Finals (1–0)

Doubles finals (0–2)

External links 
 

2002 births
Living people
Uzbekistani female tennis players
Uzbekistani people of Korean descent
21st-century Uzbekistani women